David Milne (born 7 December 1958) is a former Scotland international rugby union player.

Rugby Union career

Amateur career

He also played for Heriot's Rugby Club. He formed a front row for Heriots with his brothers Iain Milne and Kenny Milne.

Provincial career

He played for Edinburgh District.

International career

He was given 6 caps for Scotland 'B', the first being against France 'B' on 2 March 1986.

He was given a full senior cap once for Scotland in 1991. He was a replacement from the bench in Scotland's Autumn match against Japan.

Family

His brothers Iain and Kenny were also capped for Scotland.

References

Sources

 Bath, Richard (ed.) The Scotland Rugby Miscellany (Vision Sports Publishing Ltd, 2007 )

Scottish rugby union players
Scotland international rugby union players
Heriot's RC players
Living people
1958 births
Scotland 'B' international rugby union players
Edinburgh District (rugby union) players